The Regional Transit Authority of Southeast Michigan (RTA) is the agency with oversight and service coordination responsibility for mass transit operations in metropolitan Detroit, Michigan.  The counties of Macomb, Oakland, Washtenaw, and Wayne are included in the agency's jurisdiction.

Overview
The RTA is governed by a 10-member board which includes two representatives from each county and one representative from Detroit appointed by the county executives, county commission chair of Washtenaw County, and Mayor of Detroit, respectively.  Additionally, one non-voting representative is appointed by the governor; this member chairs the board.  Board members serve staggered three-year terms, and may be reappointed.  Since members are permitted to serve until a successor is appointed, in effect, they may serve beyond a three-year term. They may not be a current elected official, employee of a county or city in the region, nor an employee of a transportation provider in the region.  The board may employ a CEO to oversee the day-to-day operations of the authority.

Powers
The board is granted the authority with a 7/9 supermajority of the voting members - including at least one member from each jurisdiction - the power to:

determine the rate of and place on the ballot a levy of an assessment for the funding of transit services and operations.
determine the rate of and place on the ballot a vehicle registration tax for the funding of transit services and operations.
determine to acquire the QLine, and acquire, construct or operate planned commuter rail services in the region.

The board is granted the authority with unanimous consent the power to:

determine to acquire, construct or operate rail passenger service in the region.
determine to acquire a public transit provider in the region upon a vote of the electors of each jurisdiction.
place on the ballot a question of assuming liability or paying legacy costs of an acquired public transportation provider.

Elections for the question of the levy of assessments and vehicle registration tax increases can only be held in a presidential election year on the date of the presidential primary election.

History
The RTA has its beginnings in the Metropolitan Transportation Authorities Act of 1967 (Public Act 204).  A provision of the act specifically created the Southeastern Michigan Transportation Authority (SEMTA), but provided the authority with no additional means to levy taxes or fees to fund the operations for the transit providers it had acquired.

In 1974, facing a loss of funding from SEMTA and wanting more control of its transit affairs, Detroit's Department of Street Railways (DSR) restructured itself as the Detroit Department of Transportation (DDOT).  On December 7, 1988, Public Act 204 was amended to restructure SEMTA, reducing the service area from seven counties to three, and excluding the city of Detroit.  The new transit authority was named the Suburban Mobility Authority for Regional Transit (SMART), and began operation on January 17, 1989.  To continue limited coordination and development of services between DDOT and SMART, however, regional leaders representing the three-county area and Detroit filed articles of incorporation to form the Regional Transit Coordinating Council on January 12, 1989.

On December 19, 2012 Governor Rick Snyder signed Senate Bill No. 909 into law establishing the Regional Transit Authority (RTA), which included a provision allowing for the first time a way for such a regional transit authority to fund itself. Almost one month later, US Transportation Secretary Ray LaHood announced that the M-1 Rail Line would receive US$25 million in federal funding as he had previously indicated such support was dependent on the creation of a regional transit authority for the Detroit region.

Along with oversight and coordination responsibilities for the Detroit Department of Transportation, Suburban Mobility Authority for Regional Transportation,  Ann Arbor Area Transportation Authority, and the Detroit Transportation Corporation, the authority was also established to create a single mass transit plan for the region, including the development, funding and operation of rapid transit along four major corridors in the metropolitan area. The new plan used as its basis the Comprehensive Regional Transit Service Plan, which was adopted on December 8, 2008.  The RTA chose HNTB to assist in the development of the Regional Master Transit Plan in 2015.

Mass transit
The RTA does not operate any mass transit services, itself, but has coordinated one service brand.

Bus service
RefleX was a limited-stop, cross-county bus service which started operation on Labor Day weekend 2016.  The service consisted of a route on Woodward Avenue operated by DDOT connecting the Somerset Collection in Troy in Oakland County and Downtown Detroit, and two routes on Gratiot Avenue operated by SMART connecting Mount Clemens in Macomb County and Downtown Detroit (7 days a week) and four trips per weekday to Midtown Detroit.  The service ran from 5:00 AM to 1:00 AM on weekdays, 6:00 AM to 1:00 AM on Saturdays, and 7:00 AM to 10:00 PM on Sundays. RefleX Gratiot service ended January 1, 2018, and RefleX Woodward service ended April 21, 2018.

Projects
In early 2015, the RTA retained Parsons Brinkerhoff and AECOM to study improved mass transit along the corridors of Gratiot and Michigan avenues.  The authority also took over oversight of the Woodward Avenue Alternative Analysis Rapid Transit Alternative study, which found BRT (bus rapid transit) as the locally preferred alternative as the improved mode of transit along a 27-mile stretch of Woodward Avenue.  The master plan was officially presented to the media and public on May 31, 2016 with highlights including plans for:

4 bus rapid transit along major corridors.
8 round-trip regional rail service connecting Ann Arbor and Detroit.
11 cross-county connector routes
4 commuter express bus routes connecting employment centers.
5 express bus routes connecting to Detroit Metropolitan Airport.
New and extended existing local bus routes.
Increased paratransit services.

The plan was approved by the board on August 4, 2016 with the $4.7 billion plan to go voters for approval on November 8, 2016. The measure failed by a 50.5% to 49.5% margin, with 895,877 voting in favor of the proposal, and 913,856 in opposition. The proposal passed in the counties of Wayne and Washtenaw, but very narrowly lost in Oakland and was defeated handily in Macomb.

See also

 Transportation in metropolitan Detroit

References

External links
Regional Transit Authority of Southeast Michigan

Public transportation in Michigan
Metro Detroit
Transit agencies in the United States
Transportation in Detroit
Transportation in Macomb County, Michigan
Transportation in Oakland County, Michigan
Transportation in Washtenaw County, Michigan
Transportation in Wayne County, Michigan
Bus transportation in Michigan
Rapid transit in Michigan